Pieces of Me is the fifth studio album by American R&B recording artist Ledisi. It was released by Verve Forecast Records on June 14, 2011 in the United States. Released to critical and commercial success, the album debuted at number eight on the US Billboard 200 album chart and at number two on R&B Albums chart. Her first top-ten entry on the former chart, it is Ledisi's highest-charting album to date as of 2021. The album spawned three singles that were released to moderate success on the Billboard charts.

The album received three nominations at the 54th Grammy Awards including Best R&B Album.

Promotion
Pieces of Me was released on June 14, 2011. To promote the album, Ledisi signed CDs at a Wal-Mart in Memphis, Tennessee where she also performed as an opening act for Keri Hilson on the Road to Essence tour. She also performed in Birmingham, Alabama and Baton Rouge, Louisiana on June 15 and 16. In October through November 2011, Ledisi embarked on her first headlining tour, the Pieces of Me Tour. Selling out venues across the country, the tour had 22 shows with Timothy Bloom as the opening act.  "Pieces of Me", the album's title track, and lead single, was released in early summer of 2011, and has since peaked at number nine on the US R&B/Hip-Hop Charts. In September 2011, Ledisi released a video for her second single, "So Into You".

Critical reception

Andy Kellman from AllMusic found that songs such as “Hate Me” is "a hot Southern soul ballad and “Shut Up” packs forthright attitude with a roomy but unshakeable beat, yet the album does not quite have the bite of Turn Me Loose. It could use a couple throw-you-around-the-room rockers in the vein of Turn Me Loose's “Runnin’” and “Knockin’,” although some listeners will be so struck by the sustained high level of confidence and grace that it won’t be an issue."

Track listing

Notes
 denotes co-producer
Samples
"Coffee" contains excerpts from "Black Frost" as written and performed by Grover Washington, Jr.

Charts

Weekly charts

Year-end charts

References

2011 albums
Ledisi albums
Albums produced by Chuck Harmony
Verve Forecast Records albums